Nathan Niigan Noodin Adler, sometimes credited as Nathan Adler, is a Canadian writer of horror fiction. He is most noted for his 2020 short story collection Ghost Lake, which was the winner in the English fiction category at the 2021 Indigenous Voices Awards.

Of Jewish and Anishinaabe descent, he is a member of the Lac des Mille Lacs First Nation. He studied English literature and Native studies at Trent University, integrated media at OCAD University, and creative writing at the University of British Columbia.

He published his debut novel Wrist, a story based on the traditional First Nations mythology of the wendigo, in 2016, and he was coeditor with Christine Miskonoodinkwe Smith of the 2019 speculative fiction anthology Bawaajigan: Stories of Power. His short story "Abacus" was included in Joshua Whitehead's Lambda Literary Award-winning anthology Love After the End: An Anthology of Two-Spirit and Indigiqueer Speculative Fiction.

Adler, who identifies as two-spirit, has also done work as a visual artist.

References

External links

21st-century Canadian novelists
21st-century Canadian short story writers
21st-century Canadian male writers
21st-century First Nations writers
Canadian male novelists
Canadian male short story writers
Canadian horror writers
Canadian anthologists
First Nations novelists
Jewish Canadian writers
Canadian LGBT artists
Canadian LGBT novelists
LGBT Jews
LGBT First Nations people
Ojibwe people
Trent University alumni
OCAD University alumni
University of British Columbia alumni
Living people
Two-spirit people
Year of birth missing (living people)
21st-century Canadian LGBT people